Sir Edward Newton  (10 November 1832 – 25 April 1897) was a British colonial administrator and ornithologist.

He was born at Elveden Hall, Suffolk the sixth and youngest son of William Newton, MP. He was the brother of ornithologist Alfred Newton. He graduated from Magdelene College, Cambridge in 1857 and was one of the twenty founding members of the British Ornithologists' Union.

Newton was the Colonial Secretary for Mauritius from 1859 to 1877. From there he sent his brother a number of specimens, including the dodo and the Rodrigues solitaire, both already extinct.

In 1878, Newton initiated the first laws anywhere specifically designed to protect indigenous land birds from persecution.

Edward was later Colonial Secretary and Lieutenant-Governor of Jamaica (1877–1883). He married Mary Louisa Cranstoun, daughter of W.W.R. Kerr in 1869. She died the following year.

He is commemorated in the binomial of the Malagasy kestrel, Falco newtoni.

Phelsuma edwardnewtoni, a species of gecko, is named in his honor.

Bibliography 
 
  (with five plates)

References 

1832 births
1897 deaths
People from Elveden
British ornithologists
Colonial Administrative Service officers
British Mauritius people
Zoological collectors
Colonial Secretaries of Jamaica